FC Torpedo Georgiyevsk was a Russian football team from Georgiyevsk. It played professionally from 1997 to 1999. Their best result was 12th place in Russian Second Division, Zone South in 1998.

Team name history
 1910–2003: FC Torpedo Georgiyevsk
 2003–2004: FC Torpedo-Mashuk Georgiyevsk
 2007– : FC Torpedo Georgiyevsk

External links
  Team history at KLISF

Association football clubs established in 1997
Association football clubs disestablished in 2005
Defunct football clubs in Russia
Sport in Stavropol Krai
2005 disestablishments in Russia